Salem High School is a four-year public high school in Salem, Massachusetts, United States. It has an enrollment of approximately 900 students (as of 2016), and is accredited by the Massachusetts Department of Education and the New England Association of Schools and Colleges.

Student life and demographics
In addition to academics, students have access to a variety of clubs and organizations. The school has a Student Council, which is made up of students and two faculty advisers who work with the administration to solve issues other students may have. Students can join the National Honor Society and the Tri-M, Music Honor Society, in which students can apply during their junior or senior year, along with the National Art Honor Society and Spanish Honor Society, to which students can apply during their sophomore year. The school also offers an extraordinary music department, with programs such as the Marching Band, which is commonly known as The Pride Of The North Shore and "Witch Pitch?" a talented A capella group that has been active for approximately a decade. Salem High School is a member of the Junior Reserve Officers' Training Corps (JROTC). "The effects of a Marine Corps JROTC unit extend far beyond the classroom and into the community in developing character, leadership, and civic responsibility. The program makes a difference by keeping kids in school, providing an environment conducive to their personal development and growth, and helping them become productive members of the community." The school has a very high number of absences, exceeding 100 students daily. As of 2016, Mandarin and Arabic were removed from the school's curriculum, although Spanish, French and Latin are still available as language courses.

Student Demographics (2019–20):
 White – 40.4%
 Hispanic – 45.1%
 African-American – 6.8%
 Asian – 3.1%
 Multi-race – 4.6%

These demographics reflect the city of Salem's growing ethnic diversity.

Athletics
Salem High School is a member of the Massachusetts Interscholastic Athletic Association (District A), in which it is part of the Northeastern Conference. Athletics are open to all students at Salem High School during Fall, Winter, and Spring seasons. 

Fall Sports
 Cross Country
 Football
 Girls Volleyball
 Girls Field Hockey
 Boys Soccer
 Girls Soccer
 Golf
 Football Cheerleading
Winter Sports
 Boys Basketball
 Girls Basketball
 Boys Indoor Track
 Girls Indoor Track
 Swimming
 Gymnastics
 Hockey
 Wrestling
 Hockey Cheerleading
 Basketball Cheerleading
Spring Sports
 Baseball
 Softball
 Boys Lacrosse
 Girls Lacrosse
 Boys Spring Track
 Girls Spring Track
 Boys Tennis
 Girls Tennis
 Boys Volleyball

2013 Renovation of Bertram Field
The City Council in Salem approved a $1,900,000 renovation of the existing Bertram Field, which is named after North Shore Medical Center captain, John Bertram.

Over the summer of 2013, there was a complete renovation of the entire Bertram Field complex. Construction crews installed a new artificial turf field, a track for running, a scoreboard, and a flagpole. This was an important investment because the field is used by the Salem High School athletics program, in addition to various youth sports programs across from the City of Salem.

2018 Resignation of Longstanding Principal 
After a total of 23 years at Salem High School with 12 of those years as Principal of the school, David Angeramo resigned from his position as principal to become associate head of school at St. Mary's High School in Lynn. According to the Superintendent of Salem Public Schools, Margarita Ruiz, he was well liked during his time at the school, but his sudden departure was saddening for various students, teachers and parents.

Notable graduates
 Rick Brunson (born 1972), 9-year NBA veteran.
 Gardner Dozois (1947–2018), writer
 Jeff Juden (born 1971), former Major League Baseball pitcher for the Astros and Indians.
 John D. Keenan (born 1965), former U.S. State Representative for the 7th Essex District in Massachusetts, and the current President of Salem State University.
 Eugene Lacritz (1929–2012), conductor, clarinetist, and specialty retail executive in Texas.
 Wayne Millner (1913–1976), National Football League (NFL) player.
 Scoonie Penn (born 1977), former college basketball player at Boston College and Ohio State University, drafted 57th overall by the Atlanta Hawks in the 2000 NBA draft.
 Al Ruscio (1924–2013), actor
 Sean P. Stellato (born 1978), former AF2 player with the Florida Firecats, Louisville Fire, and Memphis Xplorers. Currently an author, motivational speaker, and sports agent representing several NFL players.
 Jack Welch (1935–2020), former chairman and CEO of General Electric.
 Cy Wentworth (1904–1986), NFL player.
 Samuel Zoll (1934–2011), former Mayor of Salem, and former Chief Justice of Massachusetts District Courts.

References

External links
 Salem High School 

Buildings and structures in Salem, Massachusetts
Schools in Essex County, Massachusetts
Public high schools in Massachusetts
Northeastern Conference